The Church of the Resurrection is a historic Episcopal church and rectory in Richmond Hill, Queens, New York City.  It was originally built in 1874 as a frame, Gothic Revival style church.  It was extensively remodeled and enlarged in 1904 in the Late Gothic / Tudor Revival style. It has an exterior of random quarry-faced stone and a prominent bell tower with spire.  The church includes the Riis family memorial window, donated in 1905 by Elizabeth Riis, wife of Jacob Riis.  The adjacent Cummings Hall was built in 1923.  The rectory was built in 1888 and is a -story, frame dwelling with a hipped roof and gable dormers in the Queen Anne style.

The church is also notable for its association with Jacob Riis, a social reformer and pioneering photojournalist who was a Richmond Hill resident from 1885 to 1912 and a church member from 1900 to 1912. Theodore Roosevelt, a close friend and associate of Riis, visited the church to attend the marriage of Riis's daughter Clara to Dr. William Fiske on June 1, 1900. Roosevelt was Governor of New York at the time.

It was listed on the National Register of Historic Places in 2003.

Gallery

References

External links

The Church of the Resurrection website

Churches in Queens, New York
Richmond Hill, Queens
Churches completed in 1904
20th-century Episcopal church buildings
Properties of religious function on the National Register of Historic Places in Queens, New York
Queen Anne architecture in New York City
Tudor Revival architecture in New York City
1904 establishments in New York City